Sezgin Coşkun (born 23 August 1984) is a Turkish former footballer who played as a right back or centre back.

External links
 
 Profile at futbolig.com.tr 
 

1984 births
People from Ardahan
Living people
Turkish footballers
Association football defenders
Eyüpspor footballers
Gaziantep F.K. footballers
Eskişehirspor footballers
MKE Ankaragücü footballers
Elazığspor footballers
Süper Lig players
TFF First League players
TFF Second League players